The Royal Australian Armoured Corps (RAAC) is a corps of the Australian Army which provides the Australian Defence Force's armour capability. Armour combines firepower, mobility, protection and networked situational awareness to generate shock action and overmatch in close combat. Armour is an essential element of the combined arms approach that is employed by the Australian Army.

The RAAC has its origins in the Australian Tank Corps, which was formed in 1928. The Australian Armoured Corps was formed on 9 July 1941 to administer those personnel whose primary function is to operate, instruct or manage Army's Armoured Fighting Vehicles (AFV). As a result of the increasing mechanisation of the Army, the Armoured Corps absorbed the Australian Light Horse, Australia's Cavalry of World War One fame, on 8 May 1942. The Armoured Corps was granted the 'Royal' prefix in 1948 in recognition of its service during the Second World War.

Today the RAAC provides administrative support to its members who perform the function of mounted combat in the Army.  It has four Regular Army units and five Army Reserve units. The RAAC is the senior arms corps within the Army and the custodian of the customs and traditions of Australia's mounted soldiers.

Role 
The role of the Royal Australian Armoured Corps is to locate, identify, destroy or capture the enemy, by day or night, in combination with other arms, using fire and manoeuvre.

Organisation 
To perform this role and associated functions RAAC units are organised as either:

Armoured Cavalry – contains one tank, two cavalry and support squadrons which provide mounted close combat, reconnaissance, surveillance and security to a Combat Brigade.

Light Cavalry – contains light cavalry and protected mobility squadrons which provide mounted and dismounted reconnaissance, surveillance, security and protected mobility to a Combat Brigade.

Until 2014, each regular regiment maintained a specific role, with 1st Armoured Regiment serving as the Australian Army's sole unit equipped with main battle tanks (MBTs), while 2nd Cavalry Regiment and 2nd/14th Light Horse Regiment (Queensland Mounted Infantry) were equipped with ASLAV vehicles in the armoured reconnaissance role. Upon the implementation of Plan Beersheba, these single roles were altered; each of the three regular regiments received a squadron of M1A1 Abrams MBTs, a squadron of M113 armoured personnel carriers and a squadron of ASLAVs and transitioned into the integrated armoured cavalry role.

Equipment

As at January 2020, RAAC units are primarily equipped with the following vehicle types:
M1A1 Abrams Integrated Management Situational Awareness (AIM SA) Abrams – the Abrams is Australia's Main battle tank (MBT), which equips the Regular Army regiments.
Australian Service Light Armoured Vehicle (ASLAV) – the ASLAV is Australia's Combat Reconnaissance Vehicle (CRV), which equips the Regular Army regiments.
M113AS4 – the M113AS4 is an upgraded M113 Armoured personnel carrier (APC) which equips the Regular Army regiment's tank squadrons in support roles.
M88A2 Hercules – the Hercules is Australia's Armoured recovery vehicle (ARV) which equips the Regular Army regiments.
Bushmaster Protected Mobility Vehicle – the Bushmaster is Australia's protected mobility vehicle (PMV) used to provide protected lift by the Army Reserve regiments.
Mercedes Benz G-Wagon 6 × 6 is currently replacing the Land Rover Perentie versions in the Surveillance and Reconnaissance Vehicle (SRV) role in the Army Reserve regiments.

Modernisation 
The Australian Army will replace or upgrade all of its AFV over the coming decade. The next generation of AFV will be delivered via a number of projects, these are:
 Land 400 Phase Two: Will replace the ASLAV with a modern Combat Reconnaissance Vehicle and associated family of vehicles. This will be the Boxer multirole armoured fighting vehicle.
 Land 400 Phase Three: This project will replace the M113AS4 armoured personnel carrier and associated family of vehicles with an Infantry fighting vehicle capability which will likely be tracked and turreted with the ability to deploy a full section of infantry. A Request for Tender was released on 24 August 2018, calling for 400 vehicles in infantry fighting vehicle, command and control, joint fires, engineer reconnaissance, engineer section, ambulance, repair and recovery variants. In addition 17 Manoeuvre Support Vehicles are sought. 
 Land 907 Phase Two: This project will upgrade the M1A1 AIM SA main battle tank system to an M1A2 standard and upgrade the M88A2 armoured recovery vehicle system to a more capable variant.
 Land 8160 Phase One: This project will deliver an armoured engineering system capability to Army. This may include armoured breaching, bridging and engineering systems.

Training 
The School of Armour provides mounted combat training to soldiers in the Australian Army and selected individuals from abroad. It designs and executes both tactical and technical training for armoured crew who specialise in either the Armoured (MBT) or Cavalry (CRV) career streams as well as Armoured Mobility (APC) qualifications. Training at the School of Armour is conducted in the following wings:
 Communications Wing
 Corps Training Wing
 Driving and Servicing Wing
 Gunnery Wing
 Tactics Wing
 Combat Command Wing – tactics training to all of the Australian Army's junior combat officers.

Both male and female soldiers and officers can and do serve within the RAAC as armoured crew.

Current units

Regular Army
1st Armoured Regiment – Armoured Cavalry 
2nd Cavalry Regiment – Armoured Cavalry
2nd/14th Light Horse Regiment (Queensland Mounted Infantry) – Armoured Cavalry
School of Armour – Training Regiment
B Squadron, 3rd/4th Cavalry Regiment – training support squadron within the School of Armour at the Combined Arms Training Centre
Directorate of Armoured Fighting Vehicle Systems, Army

Army Reserve
1st/15th Royal New South Wales Lancers – Light Cavalry (cavalry and protected mobility)
4th/19th Prince of Wales's Light Horse – Light Cavalry (cavalry and protected mobility)
12th/16th Hunter River Lancers – Light Cavalry (cavalry and protected mobility)
A Squadron, 3rd/9th Light Horse (South Australia Mounted Rifles) – Light cavalry squadron
10th Light Horse Regiment – Light cavalry (cavalry and protected mobility)

Inactive units
3rd Cavalry Regiment: Amalgamated with 4th Cavalry Regiment in 1981 to form 3rd/4th Cavalry Regiment.
4th Cavalry Regiment: Amalgamated with 3rd Cavalry Regiment in 1981 to form 3rd/4th Cavalry Regiment.
6th New South Wales Mounted Rifles: Transferred as 6th New South Wales Mounted Rifles to the Royal Australian Infantry Corps in 1956, amalgamated into Royal New South Wales Regiment 1960.
7th/21st Australian Horse: Absorbed by 4th Battalion (Australian Rifles) in 1957, now part of the Royal New South Wales Regiment.
8th/13th Victorian Mounted Rifles: Reduced to an independent squadron in 1976, disbanded in 1991 and now forms part of 4th/19th Prince of Wales' Light Horse.
15th Northern Rivers Lancers: Disbanded 1957, linked with 1st Royal New South Wales Lancers to form 1st/15th Royal New South Wales Lancers.

Operational service

Libya: 1940–41
Palestine: 1941
Cyprus: 1941
Syria: 1941–42
Egypt: 1942–43
Australia: 1941–1945
New Guinea: 1941–45
Bougainville: 1944–45
Borneo: 1944–45
Japan: 1946–49
Vietnam: 1965–71
East Timor: 1999–2010
Iraq: 2003–08
Afghanistan: 2006–2012

See also
Royal Armoured Corps
US Armor Branch
Royal New Zealand Armoured Corps
Royal Canadian Armoured Corps
South African Armoured Corps
Royal Australian Armoured Corps Museum
Royal Australian Armoured Corps Corporation
Australian armoured units of World War II
List of Australian armoured units
Tanks in the Australian Army
M113 armored personnel carriers in Australian service

Notes

References
Breen, Bob (2000). Mission Accomplished, East Timor: The Australian Defence Force Participation in the International Forces East Timor (INTERFET). Crows Nest, New South Wales: Allen & Unwin. .

Handel, P. (2003). Dust, Sand & Jungle: A History of Australian Armour During Training and Operations, 1927–1948, Royal Australian Armoured Corps Museum, Puckapunyal. .
Hopkins, R.N.L (1978). Australian Armour: A History of the Royal Australian Armoured Corps 1927–1972. Royal Australian Armoured Corps Museum, Puckapunyal. .
Mckay, G. and Nicholls, G. (2001). Jungle Tracks- Australian Armour in Vietnam. Allen and Unwin, St. Leonards. .

 

Australian armoured units
Armoured
Military units and formations established in 1941
Australian army units with royal patronage
1941 establishments in Australia
Nationstate armoured warfare branches